Stephan Lehmann (born 15 August 1963) is a Swiss former professional football goalkeeper who works as goalkeeper coach for FC Sion.

International career
Lehmann was capped 18 times for the Switzerland national team between 1989 and 1997. He was an unused substitute at the 1994 FIFA World Cup and was in the Euro 1996 squad.

Honours
FC Sion
 Swiss Cup: 1990–91, 1994–95, 1995–96, 1996–97
 Swiss Super League: 1991–92, 1996–97

References

External links
  
 Jena Profile 

Living people
1963 births
People from Schaffhausen
Sportspeople from the canton of Schaffhausen
Swiss men's footballers
Swiss expatriate footballers
SC Freiburg players
Association football goalkeepers
1994 FIFA World Cup players
UEFA Euro 1996 players
Switzerland international footballers
Expatriate footballers in Germany
Swiss expatriate sportspeople in Germany
FC Schaffhausen players
FC Luzern players
FC Sion players
FC Winterthur players
Swiss Super League players
2. Bundesliga players
Swiss-German people